Brian Casey (born January 10, 1973) is a former Canadian professional ice hockey player who last played for AaB Ishockey in the Metal Ligaen in Denmark.

Career statistics

References

External links

1973 births
Living people
Aalborg Pirates players
HC Slovan Bratislava players
Kitchener Rangers players
Odessa Jackalopes players
Saint-Jean Lynx players
SønderjyskE Ishockey players
VEU Feldkirch players
St. Louis Vipers players
Canadian expatriate ice hockey players in Slovakia
Canadian ice hockey defencemen
Canadian expatriate ice hockey players in the United States
Canadian expatriate ice hockey players in Austria
Ice hockey people from New Brunswick
Canadian expatriate ice hockey players in Denmark